N400 or N-400 may refer to:
 N400 (neuroscience), an event-related potential component elicited by meaningful stimuli (words, pictures, etc.)
 N-400 road (Spain), a highway connecting Toledo to Cuenca
 Honda N400, a car similar to the Honda N360
 Samsung N400, a mobile phone by Samsung
 Form N-400, United States Citizenship and Immigration Services application for naturalization
 A variant of the Aston Martin V8 Vantage car